Scott Conrad (born 1944) is an American film editor. He won an Academy Award in the category Best Film Editing for the film Rocky.

Selected filmography 
 Rocky (1976; co-won with Richard Halsey)

References

External links 

1944 births
Living people
Place of birth missing (living people)
American film editors
Best Film Editing Academy Award winners